School of the Americas Assassins is a 1994 American short documentary film about human rights abuses by graduates of School of the Americas. Produced by Robert Richter, it was nominated for an Academy Award for Best Documentary Short.

References

External links
School of Assassins at Richter Videos

1994 films
1994 short films
1994 documentary films
American short documentary films
American independent films
1990s short documentary films
Documentary films about human rights
1994 independent films
1990s English-language films
1990s American films